Imperativus Pro Infinitivo (IPI) is a syntactical feature in which a verbal form superficially resembling the imperative is realized, instead of the expected infinitive.

The Imperativus Pro Infinitivo is a feature of, for example, the Frisian languages.

 North Frisian (Mooring): 
 Sater Frisian: 
 West Frisian: 

The sentences read in English "Yesterday I did not feel like making dinner myself".

Syntax